Norway's Resistance Museum also known as the Norwegian Home Front Museum is a museum located at the Akershus Fortress in Oslo.

The museum collection focuses on Norwegian resistance during the occupation of Norway by Nazi Germany from 1940 to 1945. The museum displays equipment, photos and documents from the war years.

The museum was established as a foundation in 1966. The Museum was opened to the public in May 1970 by  Crown Prince Harald of Norway in celebration  of the 25th anniversary of Norwegian liberation. Architectural planning was entrusted to Norwegian architect Otto Torgersen (1910-2000)  who  working together with key personnel representing various branches of the underground forces, produced a chronological gallery through the period from the prelude in the 1930s onwards to liberation in 1945.

The museum's first manager was Knut Haugland, who managed the museum until 1983. Tore Gjelsvik was chairman of the museum's council from 1964 to 1973. Arnfinn Moland was appointed manager of the museum in 1995.

References

Other sources
Færøy, Frode  (1997)  Norges hjemmefrontmuseum: i stiftelsens år (Oslo: Norges hjemmefrontmuseum)

External links 
 Information in English Norway's Resistance Museum

Museums in Oslo
R
Norwegian resistance movement
World War II museums in Norway
Museums established in 1966
1966 establishments in Norway